Edmonston Pumping Plant is a pumping station near the south end of the California Aqueduct, which is the principal feature of the California State Water Project.  It lifts water 1,926 feet (600 m) to cross the Tehachapi Mountains where it splits into the west and east branches of the California Aqueduct serving Southern California.  It is the most powerful water lifting system in the world, not considering pumped-storage hydroelectricity stations.

There are 14 4-stage 80,000-horsepower centrifugal pumps that push the water up to the top of the mountain. Each motor-pump unit stands 65-feet high and weighs 420 tons. The pumps themselves extend downward six floors. Each unit discharges water into a manifold that connects to the main discharge lines. The two main discharge lines stairstep up the mountain in an 8400-foot-long tunnel. They are 12.5 feet in diameter for the first half and 14 feet in diameter for the last half. They each contain 8.5 million gallons of water at all times.  At full capacity, the pumps can fling nearly 2 million gallons per minute up over the Tehachapis. A 68-foot-high, 50-foot-diameter surge tank is located at the top of mountain.  This prevents tunnel damage when the valves to the pumps are suddenly open or closed.  Near the top of the lift there are valves which can close the discharge lines to prevent backflow into the pumping plant below in event of a rupture. The station consumes up to 787 MW of electricity, delivered through a dedicated 230kV transmission line from the nearby Southern California Edison Pastoria substation.

Characteristics
 Number of units: 14 (two galleries of 7)
 Normal static head: 1,970 ft
 Motor rating: 80,000 hp (60MW)
 Total motor rating: 1,120,000 hp (835 MW)
 Flow at design head: 315 ft3/s (9 m3/s)
 Total flow at design head: 4410 ft3/s (450,000 m3/h)

References

External links
 DWR Edmonston Pumping Station
 A.D. Edmonston Pumping Plant
 The Big Lift: A photo tour of the State Water Project’s Edmonston Pumping Plant

California State Water Project
Buildings and structures in Kern County, California
Water supply pumping stations in the United States
Water supply infrastructure in California
Interbasin transfer
San Joaquin Valley
Tehachapi Mountains